Toujane is a Berber Matmata mountain village in the south of Tunisia, near Medenine, divided into two parts by a valley. It is most notably remembered for its World War II importance.

In popular culture 

The village is featured in the 2005 video game Call of Duty 2, both as a mission in the single-player campaign and as a multiplayer map. The game features the mission "Retaking Lost Ground" (Toujane, Tunisia - March 11, 1943) and the later Battle of the Mareth Line.

Scenes from the film La folle de Toujane (1974, by René Vautier) were filmed in this village.

References

Populated places in Tunisia